Saint Thomas Academy (abbr. STA), originally known as St. Thomas Aquinas Seminary and formerly known as St. Thomas Military Academy, is the only all-male, Catholic, college-preparatory, military high school in Minnesota. It is located in Mendota Heights near Saint Paul. The Academy has a middle school (grades 6-8) and a high school (grades 9-12). The high school students are required to participate in military leadership classes, as the school was previously part of Army JROTC. Its sister school, Convent of the Visitation, is located across the street. Many classes and after-school activities involve both schools. It is located within the Archdiocese of Saint Paul and Minneapolis.

History 
Saint Thomas Academy was first founded as Saint Thomas Seminary by Archbishop John Ireland on September 8, 1885. STA became a U.S. Army school in 1905, and, in 1916, part of the Junior Reserve Officers' Training Corps (JROTC). In 1922, the Seminary's Academic Department separated into College of St. Thomas and St. Thomas Military Academy. Later, in 1965, the school moved to its current campus in Mendota Heights (though in a smaller iteration). A middle school was added in 1971, composing of seventh and eighth grades. STA closed its boarding school program in 1974. In 2015, the school separated from the JROTC, though it retained its military curriculum and required courses. The inaugural sixth grade class joined the Academy in 2017.

Traditions 

Each year, on the Wednesday preceding Thanksgiving, one senior is awarded the rank of Cadet Colonel, the brigade commander, and is presented with the Fleming Saber, in honor of Richard E. Fleming.

The Corps of Cadets, as the high school students are sometimes referred to, is inspected by representatives from the National Guard in the springtime. This day is called the Brigade Formal Inspection, or BFI. In addition to checking their formal uniforms, the representative asks a few questions, most of which concern the school, its history, or U.S. Army. A score out of 600 is given to the school. If the score is high enough, the students get to remove their ties for the remainder of the year. Usually, this announcement is accompanied by a celebratory throwing-of-ties during the formation time.

In the spring, the high school student body dons their formal uniforms (Class A1) for the Archbishop's Review, in which the students march around the school's track while being watched by the Archbishop of Minneapolis and St. Paul.

Sports and activities 
Saint Thomas Academy was a member of the Classic Suburban Conference (now Metro East). They participate in all 14 Minnesota State High School League sports as well as orienteering. Saint Thomas Academy also has various co-curricular activities such as band, a chess team, a debate team, VISTA Theater Company, a math team, Quiz Bowl, Knowledge Bowl, Table Tennis Club, Experimental Vehicle Team (2005 Dell-Winston School Solar Car Challenge Champions, 2006 Solar Bike Race champions, and two-time Shell Eco-marathon champions), Mock Trial, and rifle and drill teams. 83% of students participate in at least one sport.

Notable alumni

Lieutenant General Joseph K. Bratton '44
Victor Williams Best basketball player in the class of '26
Javiar Collins '96, NFL player
Christopher Cox '70, former Chairman of SEC; former United States House Representative (R-CA) and Committee Chairman
Pat Eilers '85, Notre Dame and NFL football player
Vince Flynn '84, author
Tommy Gibbons 1909, Hall of Fame boxer who fought Jack Dempsey for world's heavyweight championship in 1923, served as sheriff of Ramsey County, Minnesota 1934-1959
Thomas F. Gallagher, Justice of Minnesota Supreme Court (1943–1967)
General Alfred Gruenther '19, former Supreme Allied Commander—Europe in the 1950s
Judge Fallon Kelly, Justice of Minnesota Supreme Court (1970–1980)
Angelo John Giuliani '30, catcher in Major League Baseball
Marine Captain Richard E. Fleming '35, World War II Medal of Honor recipient
Leo Richard Hamilton, member of Wisconsin State Assembly
Matt Hanousek '82, NFL football player
John Horan '51, NBA basketball player
Fr Edward Leo Krumpelmann, Maryknoll priest who served in Jiangmen, China during World War II, later in Hong Kong
Congressman Tom Emmer '79, US Representative for Minnesota's 6th congressional district
Jim Lange, TV game show host, The Dating Game
Tom Malchow '95, captain of U.S. swim team at 2004 Summer Olympics, gold medalist (2000), former world record holder
Joseph T. O'Neill '49, lawyer and Minnesota state legislator
James O'Shaughnessy '78, chief executive officer of O'Shaughnessy Asset Management
Tim O'Shaughnessy '00, co-founder and former CEO of LivingSocial, current president and CEO at Graham Holdings Company
David Raih '99, offensive coordinator for Vanderbilt Commodores football
 Isaac Rosefelt '03, American-Israeli basketball player for Hapoel Jerusalem in Israeli Basketball Premier League
 Matt Schnobrich '97, 2008 Summer Olympics crew bronze medalist
Jordan Schroeder, professional ice hockey player, spent two years at the school, 2004–2006; member of 2006 state championship team
Ali Selim '79, director of award-winning movie Sweet Land
Bishop James P. Shannon '39, served as president of The College of Saint Thomas, then as auxiliary Bishop of Archdiocese of St. Paul/Minneapolis
Ben Tracy '94, CBS News White House correspondent
Chris Thome '87, NFL player
Michael W. Wright '56, former CEO and board of directors chair of Supervalu

References

External links

 

Boys' schools in the United States
Schools in Dakota County, Minnesota
Military high schools in the United States
Private middle schools in Minnesota
Catholic secondary schools in Minnesota
Roman Catholic Archdiocese of Saint Paul and Minneapolis
Educational institutions established in 1885
1885 establishments in Minnesota